Le Drakkar is a 1973 French film directed by Jacques Pierre.

Cast
 Sady Rebbot - Michel
 Jean Franval - Paulot
 Pierre Fromont - Mimile
 Christine Malouvrier - Arlette
 Anouk Ferjac - Kate
 Jacques Charby - Jorioz
 Dominique Rozan - Henri
 Françoise Giret - Raymonde Nogaret
 Patrick Verde - Pierre Nogaret
 Isabelle Huppert - Yolande
 Nicolas Silberg - Jean-Paul
 André Charpak - Caparacci
 Louis Julien - Marie-Anne
 Alain Dorval - Broque

See also
 Isabelle Huppert on screen and stage

External links

1973 films
French television films
1970s French-language films
1970s French films